Stéphane Ippo Susperregui (born 31 August 1984) is a French kickboxer. He is the current WKN World Oriental Rules Heavyweight and former WKA K-1 World Heavyweight champion.

He is ranked as the fifth best light heavyweight in the world by Combat Press as of September 2022, and sixth best by Beyond Kick as of October 2022.

Biography and career
Susperregui fought two of the best -95 kg Muaythai fighters, Australians 2010, Steve McKinnon for his WBC Muaythai Super Cruiserweight World title and 2012, Nathan Corbett for his W.K.N. Muay Thai World title, he lost both fights by decision but put up a good fight.

In 2011 he became WKN kickboxing oriental heavyweight champion defeating Spains Damian Garcia, he was also double WKN kickboxing Grand Prix champion. In 2011 he defeated Tefik Bajrami and Nicolas Wamba and in 2012 at Le Banner Series he defeated Julius Mocka and Enfusion Quest for honor tournament runner up Frank Muñoz after tough fight and extra round.

In 2012 he signed for Glory and fought It's Showtime -95 kg champion Danyo Ilunga in his debut on 23 March 2013 in London, losing by a flying knee KO in round two.

He won the NDC -100 kg/220 lb title with a decision win over Abderhamane Coulibaly at La 20ème Nuit des Champions in Marseille, France on November 23, 2013.

In February 2016, Stephane fought Ludovic Providence for the K-1 Event Light Heavyweight Championship -95 kg title. He won the fight by a first-round TKO.

During the June 2017 Monte Carlo Fighting Masters event, Stephane fought Sergej Maslobojev for the WAKO World K-1 94 kg title. Maslobojev won the fight by TKO, after Susperregui's corner threw in the towel in the fourth round.

Susperregui took part in the 2018 Fight Night Saint-Tropez tournament. In the semifinals, he defeated Wladimir Tok by a third-round TKO, but lost the final bout against Arnold Oborotov by decision.

Stephane made his Glory debut against Donegi Abena at Glory 60. Abena won the fight by unanimous decision. For his next fight, he was scheduled to fight Felipe Micheletti, whom he defeated by decision, after an extra round was fought. He was scheduled to fight Luis Tavares during Glory Collision 2. Tavares won the fight by unanimous decision.

Susperregui participated in the K-1 Event -95kg tournament, held on December 4, 2021. He won the tournament title after defeating Pascal Touré by decision in the semifinals, and Yuri Farcas by decision in the finals.

Susperregui was booked to face Oleg Primachev in Bilbao, Spain on March 26, 2022. The bout was later cancelled, as Primachev was unable to enter Spain due to the 2022 Russian invasion of Ukraine.

Titles
2018 Fight Night Saint-Tropez Heavyweight Tournament Runner-up
2016 K-1 Event Light Heavyweight Champion -95 kg
2013 NDC K-1 rules light heavyweight champion -100 kg 
2013 WKA K-1 rules World Heavyweight champion -95 kg
2012 WKN kickboxing GP champion -100 kg 
2011 WKN kickboxing GP champion -100 kg 
2011 WKN kickboxing oriental heavyweight world champion -96,6 kg 
2010 French K-1 champion +91 kg
2010 French muay thai Elite class A champion -86 kg
2009 French muay thai Elite class A champion -86 kg
2008 WUFC K-1 world champion -88 kg
2008 French muay thai class B champion -86 kg
2007 French muay thai cup winner

Kickboxing record

|-
|-  bgcolor="#CCFFCC"
| 2021-12-04 || Win ||align=left| Pascal Touré || K-1 Event 14, Tournament Finals || Troyes, France || Decision || 3 || 3:00
|-
! style=background:white colspan=9 |
|-  bgcolor="#CCFFCC"
| 2021-12-04 || Win ||align=left| Yuri Farcaș || K-1 Event 14, Tournament Semifinals || Troyes, France || Decision || 3 || 3:00
|-  bgcolor=
|-  bgcolor="#FFBBBB"
| 2019-12-21|| Loss||align=left| Luis Tavares || Glory Collision 2 || Arnhem, Netherlands || Decision (Unanimous) || 3 || 3:00
|-  bgcolor="#CCFFCC"
| 2019-10-12 || Win||align=left| Felipe Micheletti || Glory 69: Düsseldorf || Düsseldorf, Germany || Ext.R Decision (Unanimous) || 4 || 3:00
|-  bgcolor="#FFBBBB"
| 2018-10-20|| Loss ||align=left| Donegi Abena || Glory 60: Lyon || Lyon, France || Decision (Unanimous)|| 3 || 3:00
|-
|-  bgcolor="#FFBBBB"
| 2018-08-04 || Loss ||align=left| Arnold Oborotov || Fight Night Saint-Tropez || Saint-Tropez, France || Decision (unanimous)|| 3 || 
|-
|-  bgcolor="#CCFFCC"
| 2018-08-04 || Win ||align=left| Wladimir Tok  || Fight Night Saint-Tropez || Saint-Tropez, France || TKO || 3 ||
|-  bgcolor="#CCFFCC"
| 2018-06-30|| Win||align=left| Mikhail Tyuterev|| Monte-Carlo Fighting Trophy|| Monaco || Decision (Split)|| 3  || 3:00
|- 
|-  bgcolor="#CCFFCC"
| 2017-08-04 || Win ||align=left| Danyo Ilunga  || Fight Night Saint-Tropez || France || Decision (Unanimous) || 3 || 3:00
|-
|-  bgcolor="#FFBBBB"
| 2017-06-30 || Loss ||align=left| Sergej Maslobojev  || Monte Carlo Fighting Masters || Monte Carlo, Monaco || TKO (Towel Thrown)  || 4 || 
|-
! style=background:white colspan=9 |
|- 
|-  bgcolor="#CCFFCC"
| 2017-05-20 || Win ||align=left| Pavel Voronin || Capital Fights 2 || Paris, France || Decision || 3 || 3:00
|-
|-  style="background:#c5d2ea;"
| 2016-11-19 || NC ||align=left| Roman Kryklia || Nuit des Champions 2016 || Marseille, France || No contest || 3 || 3:00
|-
! style=background:white colspan=9 |
|-  bgcolor="#CCFFCC"
| 2016-08-04 || Win ||align=left| Suleyman Magomedov || Fight Night Saint Tropez || Saint-Tropez, France || Decision || 3 || 3:00
|-
|-  bgcolor="#CCFFCC"
| 2016-06-03 || Win ||align=left| Pavel Voronin || Phenix Boxing Only Edition 4 || Saint-Julien-en-Genevois, France ||  Decision (Unanimous) ||  3  ||  3:00
|-  bgcolor="#CCFFCC"
| 2016-02-20 || Win ||align=left| Ludovic Providence || K-1 Events 8 || Troyes, France || TKO || 1 ||
|-
! style="background:white" colspan=9 | 
|-
|-  bgcolor="CCFFCC"
| 2013-11-23 || Win ||align=left| Abdarhmane Coulibaly || La 20ème Nuit des Champions || Marseilles, France || Decision || 3 || 3:00 
|-
! style=background:white colspan=9 |
|-
|-  bgcolor="#CCFFCC"
| 2013-06-08 || Win ||align=left| Lorenzo Javier Jorge || K-1 EVENT 5 || Troyes, France || TKO || 2 ||  
|-
! style=background:white colspan=9 |
|-
|-  bgcolor="#FFBBBB"
| 2013-03-23 || Loss ||align=left| Danyo Ilunga || Glory 5: London || London, England || KO (flying knee) || 2 || 0:21
|-
|-  bgcolor="#CCFFCC"
| 2012-11-24 || Win ||align=left| Emmanuel Payet || Nuit des Champions || Marseilles, France || KO || 3 || 
|-  bgcolor="#CCFFCC"
| 2012-06-30 || Win ||align=left| Toni Milanović || F.A.S.T. gala || Bayonne, France || Decision (Unanimous) ||  || 3:00
|-  bgcolor="#CCFFCC"
| 2012-04-28 || Win ||align=left| Frank Muñoz || Le Banner Series Acte 1, Final || Geneva, Switzerland || Ext.R.Decision || 4 || 2:00 
|-
! style=background:white colspan=9 |
|-
|-  bgcolor="#CCFFCC"
| 2012-04-28 || Win ||align=left| Julius Mocka || Le Banner Series Acte 1, Semi Finals || Geneva, Switzerland || Decision || 3 || 2:00 
|-
|-  bgcolor="#FFBBBB"
| 2012-04-07 || Loss ||align=left| Nathan Corbett ||Fight Night Total Carnage|| Gold Coast, Australia || Decision || 5|| 3:00 
|-
! style=background:white colspan=9 |
|-
|-  bgcolor="#CCFFCC"
| 2012-02-25 || Win ||align=left| Milan Dašić || Championnat de France K-1 ||  || TKO ||  ||  
|-
|-  bgcolor="#CCFFCC"
| 2011-10-15 || Win ||align=left| Arnold Oborotov || Le Choc des Titans II || Graulhet, France|| Decision || 3 || 3:00
|-  bgcolor="#CCFFCC"
| 2011-05-07 || Win ||align=left| Nicolas Wamba || 7ème Nuit des Sports de Combat, Final || Geneva, Switzerland || TKO (Doctor Stop.) || 2 || 
|-
! style=background:white colspan=9 |
|-
|-  bgcolor="#CCFFCC"
| 2011-05-07 || Win ||align=left| Tefik Bajrami || 7ème Nuit des Sports de Combat, Semi Finals || Geneva, Switzerland || KO || 2 ||
|-
|-  bgcolor="#CCFFCC"
| 2011-05-24 || Win ||align=left| Damian Garcia || || Troyes, France || KO  || 2 || 
|-
! style=background:white colspan=9 |
|-
|-  bgcolor="#CCFFCC"
| 2011-03-12 || Win ||align=left| Massinissa Hamaili || || Bayonne, France || Decision  || 5 || 3:00
|-
|-  bgcolor="#FFBBBB"
| 2010-12-19 || Loss ||align=left| Steve McKinnon ||WCK Muay Thai || Hainan Island, China || Decision (Majority)  || 5 || 3:00
|-
! style=background:white colspan=9 |
|-
|-  bgcolor="#c5d2ea"
| 2010-02-27 || Draw ||align=left| Yuksel Ayaydin || La Nuit du Muay Thai VII || France || Decision Draw || 3 || 3:00
|-
|-  bgcolor="#CCFFCC"
| 2010-02-06 || Win ||align=left| Zinedine Hameur-Lain || Gala de Saumur  ||France || TKO || 3 || 
|-
|-  bgcolor="#CCFFCC"
| 2010-04-24 || Win ||align=left| Corentin Jallon || Fight Zone 4  ||France || Decision || 3 || 3:00
|-
|-  bgcolor="#CCFFCC"
| 2008-08-22 || Win ||align=left| Artur Avakyan  ||14th WUFC World Ultimate Full Contact || Viseu, Portugal || KO (Right high kick)  || 1 || 00:33
|-
! style=background:white colspan=9 |
|-

See also 
List of male kickboxers

References

External links 
 Muaythaitv profile

1984 births
Living people
French-Basque people
French male kickboxers
Cruiserweight kickboxers
Place of birth missing (living people)
French Muay Thai practitioners
People from Saint-Jean-de-Luz